Rebecca Ann Jockusch, Ph.D. (UC Berkeley, 2001), is a Canadian chemist; she is an associate professor at the Department of Chemistry of the University of Toronto (UToronto) who is active in the field of mass spectrometry.

References

Literature 
 Adrian G. Brook, W. A. E. (Peter) McBryde. Historical Distillates: Chemistry at the University of Toronto since 1843. — Dundurn, 2007. — P. 180, 192, 208. — 258 p. — .
 Kulesza et al. Excited States of Xanthene Analogues: Photofragmentation and Calculations by CC2 and Time-Dependent Density Functional Theory // ChemPhysChem. — 2016. — August (vol. 17, iss. 19). — P. 3129–3138. — ISSN 1439-4235. — DOI:10.1002/cphc.201600650.

Web-sources 
 

Living people
21st-century Canadian chemists
Academic staff of the University of Toronto
Year of birth missing (living people)
21st-century Canadian women scientists
Canadian women chemists